Sucden (Sucres et Denrées) is a French-based commodity broker of soft commodities and other financial products headquartered in Paris.  The firm started as a sugar broker and is now amongst the world leaders with a market share of around 15% in volume, or 9.5 million tonnes. It has offices in a number of countries around the world, including London and Hong Kong.

History
The company was founded in Paris in 1952 as Sucres et Denrées by Maurice Varsano and Jacques Roboh, who had started as sugar sellers in Morocco after World War II.

In the 2000s, the company expanded into Russia, and began dealing in softs such as cocoa, coffee, and ethanol.

It acquired the New York City-based Coffee Americas in 2014 and the Amsterdam-based Nedcoffee in 2015.

Subsidiaries

Sucden Financial

Sucden Financial is Sucden's London-based multi-asset execution, clearing and liquidity provider for FX, fixed income and commodity instruments. Sucden Financial's parent is Sucden, a company incorporated in France. The group's main activity is sugar trading,

Sucden Financial is a member of the world's major commodities exchanges, is one of only 9 Ring-Dealing members on the London Metal Exchange and is able to deal in virtually all commodity and financial futures and options contracts, as well as foreign exchange and fixed income.

Clients trade financial derivative contracts on agricultural commodities such as sugar, coffee, cocoa, cotton and grains and oil seeds, industrial commodities such as base metals, steel, iron ore and energy, precious metals to foreign exchange and other financial instruments.

Other subsidiaries

Sucden Côte d'Ivoire
Sucden cocoa Nigeria
Sucden Americas corp
Coffee America (USA) corporation
General Cocoa Company (genco)
Sucden Mexico
Sucden do Brasil
Sucden Recife
Sucden Argentina
Sucden Chile
Sucden Peru
Sucden Asia
Sucden China
Sucden India pvt. ltd.
Sucden Malaysia
Sucden Thailand
Sucden Philippines
Nedcommodities India
Sucden Coffee Indonesia (formerly known as NedCoffee Indonesia)
NedCoffee Vietnam
Sucden Paris
Sucden Geneva
Sucden Italia
Sucden Russia
Nedcoffee B.V.
Sucden Financial limited
Sucden Middle East

References

Financial services companies established in 1952
Financial services companies of France
Financial derivative trading companies
Foreign exchange companies
1952 establishments in France